"Married in Vegas" is a song by British pop rock band The Vamps. It was released as a digital download on 31 July 2020 via Virgin EMI as the lead single from their fifth studio album Cherry Blossom. The song was written by James McVey, Tristan Evans, Bradley Simpson, Connor Ball and Peter Rycroft.

Background
In an interview with Vents magazine, Bradley Simpson said, "On the day we handed the album in I went on a Zoom call with Lostboy. We had a few beers and then four hours later 'Married in Vegas' was birthed." James McVey also said, "I was playing Playstation with my mates and it was about 11pm. Then Brad Face Timed me and he was like 'I've just written this song!'. I love moments like that because even when you think something's done it can still change at the last minute. We jumped on a zoom with Lostboy the next morning to finish the song."

Music video
A music video to accompany the release of "Married in Vegas" was first released on YouTube on 31 July 2020. The video was filmed remotely in lockdown with help from producer Lostboy.

Track listing

Personnel
Credits adapted from Tidal.
 Bradley Simpson – guitar, vocals
 Lostboy – production, keyboards, programming, record engineering
 Luke Burgoyne – mixing assistance
 Charles Haydon Hicks – mixing assistance
 Tristan Evans – drums
 Stuart Hawkes – master engineering
 Dan Grech-Marguerat – mixing, programming

Charts

Release history

References

2020 singles
2020 songs
The Vamps (British band) songs